Christopher Latham Baillieu MBE (born 12 December 1949) is an English former rower who competed in the 1976 Summer Olympics and in the 1980 Summer Olympics representing Great Britain. He was the first chairman of British Swimming, from 2001 to 2008.

Early life
Baillieu was born in Marylebone, the son of Edward Latham Baillieu and his wife Betty Anne Jardine Taylor. He was the grandson of Clive Baillieu, 1st Baron Baillieu. He was educated at Radley College and at Jesus College, Cambridge. He was called to the Bar at Lincoln's Inn in 1976.

Rowing
Baillieu rowed in the winning Cambridge boat in the Boat Races in 1970,  1971,  1972 and  1973. He then concentrated on sculling, and won the Double Sculls Challenge Cup at Henley Royal Regatta with Mike Hart in 1973 and 1975. In between he won the double sculls title with Mike Hart, at the 1974 National Championships and participated in the 1974 World Rowing Championships in Lucerne, competing in the double sculls event with Hart again, which resulted in winning a bronze medal. He was part of the double scull that won a bronze medal at the 1975 World Rowing Championships in Nottingham.

In Montreal they won a silver medal for double sculls rowing at the 1976 Summer Olympics. The same pair won the Double Sculls Challenge Cup again in 1977 and a gold medal at the World Championships. Hart and Baillieu won the Double Sculls Challenge Cup again in 1978 but in 1979 he won with a new partner Jim Clark. In 1980, Baillieu and Clark finished fourth in the Double Sculls, rowing at the 1980 Summer Olympics in Moscow.

Baillieu then concentrated on single sculls and won the Wingfield Sculls four years running from 1981 to 1984, and the Diamond Challenge Sculls at Henley Royal Regatta in 1981, 1982, and 1984. He also won the single sculls rowing for the Leander Club, at the 1981 National Championships.

Personal
In 1984, Baillieu married Jane Elizabeth Bowie with whom he has had two sons and one daughter Charles, Olivia, and Edward.

See also
 List of Cambridge University Boat Race crews

References

External links
 
 
 

1949 births
Living people
People educated at Radley College
Alumni of Jesus College, Cambridge
English male rowers
English Olympic medallists
Cambridge University Boat Club rowers
Olympic medalists in rowing
Olympic rowers of Great Britain
Olympic silver medallists for Great Britain
Medalists at the 1976 Summer Olympics
Rowers at the 1976 Summer Olympics
Rowers at the 1980 Summer Olympics
Members of Leander Club
Stewards of Henley Royal Regatta
English people of Belgian descent
Members of Lincoln's Inn
Members of the Order of the British Empire
World Rowing Championships medalists for Great Britain
English people of Australian descent
European Rowing Championships medalists